Khosrow in Iran may refer to:

Khosrow, Andika, Khuzestan Province
Khosrow Beyg, Markazi Province
Khosrow Beyk Rural District, in Markazi Province
Khosrow, Tehran
Khosrow Castle, in Ardabil County, Ardabil Province